Batchellerville Presbyterian Church is a historic Presbyterian church on Co. Rt. 7 in Batchellerville, Saratoga County, New York.  It was built in 1867 and is a rectangular, timber-framed church in the Greek Revival style.  It was moved to its present site in 1931.  It features a two-stage, louvered belfry topped by a bell cast metal roof.

It was listed on the National Register of Historic Places in 2000.

References

Presbyterian churches in New York (state)
Churches on the National Register of Historic Places in New York (state)
Greek Revival church buildings in New York (state)
Churches completed in 1867
19th-century Presbyterian church buildings in the United States
Churches in Saratoga County, New York
National Register of Historic Places in Saratoga County, New York